Chelidze is a surname. Notable people with the surname include:

Giorgi Chelidze (born 1986), Georgian footballer
Zaza Chelidze (born 1987), Georgian footballer
 

Georgian-language surnames